The Free University of New York (FUNY) was an educational social enterprise initiated by Allen Krebs, Sharon Krebs and James Mellen in July 1965.

FUNY began as a home for professors dismissed from local universities for protesting the Vietnam War, or for holding socialist views. Course topics included: Black Liberation, Revolutionary Art and Ethics, Community Organization, The American Radical Tradition, Cuba and China, and Imperialism and Social Structure. FUNY opened on July 6, 1965 in a loft at 20 East 14th Street overlooking Union Square. 
 FUNY began as an experimental school for the New Left, built on models such as Black Mountain College (North Carolina), though it became closely aligned with the Maoist Progressive Labor Party. Tuition for the 10-week session was $24 for the first course, and $8 for each additional course; welfare recipients could attend for free. After the first year, many of the initial collaborators left or were forced to leave, and it shut down a few years later.

Notable participants

 Herbert Aptheker
 Stanley Aronowitz
 Lee Baxandall
 Charles R. Johnson
 Allen Krebs
 Paul Krassner
 Tuli Kupferberg
 Leonard Liggio
 Staughton Lynd
 Bradford Lyttle
 Jackson Mac Low
 Lyn Marcus
 David McReynolds
 Hugo Mujica
 Carolee Schneemann
 Susan Simensky Bietila
 Robert Anton Wilson

See also
 The New School
 Free school
 New Left
Midpeninsula Free University

References

Educational institutions established in 1965
1965 establishments in New York City
Free universities